Jörg van Nieuwenhuijzen (born 22 August 1978 in Bergen op Zoom, North Brabant) is a retired former professional Dutch football player who played as a goalkeeper in the top tiers of Dutch Football for RBC Roosendaal, Excelsior Rotterdam, and Heracles Almelo. After his playing career, he emigrated to Canada and became a sports entrepreneur. Van Nieuwenhuijzen Co-Founded Dutch Connections FC, a Toronto-based soccer service provider affiliated with Feyenoord from Rotterdam. In 2019 he Founded a Toronto-based international sports consulting company.

Honours

Club

RBC Roosendaal

• Play off winners first division 1999-2000

Excelsior

• Play off winners first division 2001-2002

• Champions First Division 2005-2006

References

1978 births
Living people
Dutch footballers
RBC Roosendaal players
Excelsior Rotterdam players
Heracles Almelo players
HSV Hoek players
Eredivisie players
Eerste Divisie players
Sportspeople from Bergen op Zoom
Association football goalkeepers
FC Lienden players
Footballers from North Brabant